Microdrassus is a monotypic genus of East African ground spiders containing the single species, Microdrassus inaudax. It was first described by R. de Dalmas in 1919, and has only been found in Seychelles.

References

Gnaphosidae
Monotypic Araneomorphae genera
Spiders of Africa